Nabis lativentris is a type of damsel bug in the family Nabidae.

References

Nabidae